Ben Hammersley FRSA FRGS (born 3 April 1976) is a British technologist, strategic foresight consultant, futurist, keynote speaker, broadcaster and systems developer, based in New York City.  He specializes on Adaptive Futurism and Cognitive Risk from a multidisciplinary perspective.

Education
Hammersley is the eldest of three children and was educated at Loughborough Grammar School, and the School of Oriental and African Studies, from which he dropped out after a year.

Technology and strategic forecasting

Hammersley is the founder and principal of Hammersley Futures, an international strategic foresight consultancy advising corporates and governments on futureproofing and risk planning. Hammersley Futures specializes on how society reacts to technological innovation and the changing nature of the workplace, crime and conflict, and the market,  and on tools to adapt to the changes.  Clients include the UK Foreign Office, the European Commission, the US government, HSBC, Vodafone, Deloitte and other corporates.

As a leading futurist, he gives keynote presentations to corporates and large events internationally.
 
Until 2013, he was the UK Prime Minister's Ambassador to East London Tech City.

Multimedia reporting and broadcasting
In 2015, Hammersley presented a six-part BBC World News series on cybercrimes.
He has twice presented on BBC Radio 4's documentary strand Analysis, covering Facebook in November 2007, and personal genetic testing in December 2008. He also presented the five-part BBC series Futureproof Yourself.

Hammersley previously worked as an internet reporter for The Times.  He was Associate Editor and  Editor-at-Large at the launch of the UK edition of Conde Nast's Wired UK magazine.

In 2006, he pioneered multi-platform journalism for The Guardian covering conflict in Afghanistan, and in 2007 also for the BBC covering the election in Turkey. He later used the systems he developed to build The Guardian'''s pioneering range of blogs, including the award-winning Comment is Free.

Podcast
Hammersley is known for coining the term "podcast" in an article he wrote for The Guardian'' in 2004. It was declared "Word of the Year" by the New Oxford American Dictionary in 2005. Hammersley has said that he made the word up to pad out an article he was writing that was a little too short.

Fellowships and associations
Hammersley is a member of the Transatlantic Network 2020, and a trustee of the London chapter of the Awesome Foundation. In August 2011 he was made a fellow of the UNAOC. He is a judge of the Lovie Awards.

In 2013, Hammersley became a fellow of the Robert Schuman School for Advanced Studies at the European University Institute, Innovator-in-Residence at the Centre for Creative and Social Technologies at Goldsmiths, University of London,  a member of the European Commission High Level Expert Group on Media Freedom, and a non-resident fellow of the Brookings Institution.

Personal life
Hammersley is married to Aleks Krotoski, with whom he has a daughter.
Hammersley is a pilot, a licensed Emergency medical technician and Wilderness Medic, a triathlete and ultra-runner, a diver, photographer, and disaster response volunteer.

Bibliography
Hammersley has authored or co-authored several books on technology and journalism.

References

External links

1976 births
Living people
People from Leicester
People educated at Loughborough Grammar School
Alumni of SOAS University of London
British bloggers
British male journalists
British technology journalists
British technology writers
Online journalists
Fellows of the Royal Geographical Society
Male bloggers
Brookings Institution people